Uncharted 4: A Thief's End is a 2016 action-adventure game developed by Naughty Dog and published by Sony Computer Entertainment. It is the fourth main entry in the Uncharted series. Set several years after the events of Uncharted 3: Drake's Deception, players control Nathan Drake, a former treasure hunter coaxed out of retirement by his presumed-dead brother Samuel. With Nathan's longtime partner, Victor Sullivan, they search for clues to the location of Henry Avery's long-lost treasure. A Thief's End is played from a third-person perspective, and incorporates platformer elements. Players solve puzzles and use firearms, melee combat, and stealth to combat enemies. In the online multiplayer mode, up to ten players engage in co-operative and competitive modes.

Development of Uncharted 4 began in 2011, soon after the release of Uncharted 3. It was led by creative director Amy Hennig and game director Justin Richmond. Development was hampered in 2014 due to Hennig and Richmond's departure from Naughty Dog; they were replaced by Neil Druckmann and Bruce Straley. The team sought to incorporate elements of open-world gameplay, with larger levels to encourage free-roaming exploration and combat. The relationship between Nathan and Elena was central, and Naughty Dog attempted to humanize them more than in previous games. A Thief's End was released in May 2016 for the PlayStation 4. It was the first Naughty Dog game developed specifically for the PlayStation 4. The team took advantage of the hardware to process larger dynamic environments.

Following its announcement in November 2013, A Thief's End was widely anticipated. The game was acclaimed by critics, who praised its gameplay, narrative, emotional depth, visuals, and multiplayer, with several reviewers finding the game a worthy conclusion to Nathan's story. Considered one of the greatest video games ever made, it won year-end accolades, including Game of the Year awards from several gaming publications, critics, and award ceremonies. With over 15million copies sold, it is the highest-selling Uncharted game and one of the best-selling PlayStation 4 games. A standalone expansion, Uncharted: The Lost Legacy, was released in 2017. A remastered version, alongside The Lost Legacy as part of the Uncharted: Legacy of Thieves Collection, was released in January 2022 for PlayStation 5 and October 2022 for Windows.

Gameplay 
Uncharted 4: A Thief's End is an action-adventure game played from a third-person perspective, with platforming elements. Players traverse several environments, moving through locations including towns, buildings, and wilderness to advance through the game's story. Players use firearms, melee combat, and stealth to combat hostile enemies. For most of the game, players control Nathan Drake—a treasure hunter who is physically adept and can jump, sprint, climb, swim, scale narrow ledges and walls, swing with a rope, use a grappling hook and perform other acrobatic actions. Players also drive vehicles during some gameplay segments.

In combat, players can use long-ranged weapons, such as rifles and shotguns, and short-barreled guns such as pistols and revolvers; handheld explosives such as grenades and dynamite are also available. The game's melee combat system was also reworked to avoid the presence of quick time events. The grappling hook allows players to leap over gaps, often giving them a tactical advantage in combat. Though players can attack enemies directly, they have the option to use stealth tactics to attack undetected or sneak by them. While the game is linear, environments feature multiple paths for players to explore; maps are significantly larger than earlier entries in the series.

The game features an artificial intelligence system in which hostile enemies react to any combat situation they are placed in; they respond to players' actions, coordinate tactics, and cooperate with each other. Players' companions are also controlled by artificial intelligence. The game introduces a dialogue tree, allowing players to decide the outcome of some conversations, though it does not affect the story's progression. Extra visual filters and modes, such as a zero-gravity mode, bullet time gameplay, and a cel-shaded art style, can be unlocked by using points players collected in the main game.

Multiplayer 
The game's online multiplayer allows up to ten players to engage in competitive gameplay in recreations of multiple single-player settings. Players control different characters from the series, and are tasked to defeat their opponents. The game features five multiplayer game types: Command, in which players capture sites to attain points; Ranked and Team Deathmatch, which are deathmatch game types where players kill their opponents; Plunder, a capture the flag game mode in which players seek the idol; and Trials, where players cooperate to defeat non-player characters. Treasures can be found in all maps, which can be used to purchase items and weapons. Multiplayer features "Mysticals"—supernatural power-ups that boost players' ability; for example, the "Wrath of El Dorado" damages all opponents standing next to it, while the "Cintamani Stone" can heal both players and their teammates. Companions, known as Sidekicks, can be summoned to assist players, and have different functions: Hunters immobilize their closest opponent for an easier kill, Saviors provide medical support and ammunition to players, Snipers defend locations with a sniper rifle, and Brutes attack enemies using a heavy machine gun. A cooperative survival mode, released in December 2016, features three players fighting against waves of enemies that continually increase in difficulty.

Synopsis

Characters 
The main character of Uncharted 4: A Thief's End is Nathan "Nate" Drake (Nolan North), a veteran adventurer and explorer who, following the events of Uncharted 3: Drake's Deception (2011), has retired from fortune hunting alongside his wife Elena Fisher (Emily Rose), a journalist, to a more normal life, and taken up employment with a salvage company in New Orleans. The game introduces Samuel "Sam" Drake (Troy Baker), Nate's older brother, who was presumed dead. Drawn back into his old life of adventure by his brother, Nathan is aided by his long-term friend, fellow adventurer, mentor and father figure Victor "Sully" Sullivan (Richard McGonagle). Their journey to find and recover the long-lost treasure of pirate Henry Avery brings them into conflict with wealthy and dangerous businessman and treasure hunter Rafe Adler (Warren Kole), his partner Nadine Ross (Laura Bailey) who runs the private mercenary group Shoreline, and drug lord Hector Alcazar (Robin Atkin Downes). The child versions of Nate and Sam are portrayed by Britain Dalton and Chase Austin, respectively.

Plot 
Several years before the events of the first game, Nate and Sam hunt for the treasure of pirate Henry Avery, who plundered a fortune during the 1695 Gunsway heist. Alongside Rafe, the Drake brothers infiltrate a Panamanian jail to access the former cell of Avery's first mate, where Nate discovers a hollow St. Dismas idol. When the prison warden who aided them demands a cut, Rafe impulsively kills him, triggering a frantic escape. Nate and Rafe successfully escape, but Sam is shot by guards and presumed dead.

Fifteen years later, following the events of the previous game, Nate has retired in New Orleans with his wife Elena but misses the excitement of his old life. He is visited by Sam, who survived the gunshots and has spent the intervening time incarcerated. He explains that he escaped with drug lord Hector Alcazar, who demands that Sam find Avery's treasure or be killed. Nate agrees to help Sam, lying to Elena that he has accepted a salvaging job in Malaysia which he had refused. Aided by Sully, the Drakes steal a duplicate Dismas idol from an illegal auction in Italy, bringing them into conflict with South African mercenary boss Nadine Ross and her employer, Rafe, who is still searching for Avery's treasure. A map inside the idol leads the Drakes to St. Dismas' cathedral in the Scottish Highlands. There, they discover a hidden temple and a map highlighting King's Bay in Madagascar.

In King's Bay, the Drakes and Sully learn that Avery, Thomas Tew, and ten other pirate captains pooled their treasures. Following clues to a tower in the city, Nate uncovers a map to Libertalia, a fabled pirate utopia founded by the other captains. The group returns to their hotel to find Elena waiting. Upset at Nate's deception and the appearance of Sam, whom Nate had never mentioned, Elena leaves. Nate sends Sully after her. The Drakes follow the map to an island and discover Libertalia. They find evidence of a civil war; the founders stole the city's treasure and moved it across the island to New Devon, an extravagant and well-fortified town built for them. The brothers are cornered by Rafe, who reveals that he released Sam from jail two years ago and that Sam's Alcazar story is a lie, he actually double-crossed Rafe to resume the search with Nate. Deciding that he needs Sam, Rafe prepares to shoot Nate; Sam shields him, but Nate is knocked off a cliff and falls unconscious.

Elena rescues Nate, who reveals his past: as teenagers, he and Sam discovered that their mother, a brilliant historian, was researching Libertalia. The boys, after nearly being caught by cops due to breaking into the house of the person associated with their mother, decided to start new lives by changing their surname to Drake to honor their mother's theory about Francis Drake's descendants. In New Devon, Nate and Elena learn that Libertalia descended into conflict over the treasure. Tew and Avery poisoned the other founders and absconded with the hoard, but Tew betrayed Avery.

The group rescues Sam and convinces him to escape with them, but he soon decides to pursue the treasure. Following Sam's trail, Nate finds Avery's treasure-laden ship in a cavern. Having collected a large amount of treasure, Nadine refuses to risk more of Avery's traps, but Rafe coerces her by bribing her men. Aboard the ship, Sam triggers a trap, starting a fire and pinning him beneath rubble. Nate confronts Rafe and Nadine in the ship hold, where the skeletons of Avery and Tew lie, having killed each other over the treasure. Nadine betrays Rafe and leaves him with Nate and Sam to die. Rafe challenges Nate to a sword fight. Nate drops a bundle of treasure on Rafe, killing him, and frees Sam. The pair return to Sully's plane, and the group escapes.

Sam and Sully team up for a new job while Nate and Elena return home. Elena explains that Sam recovered some of the gold and gave it to her. Realizing that they both need adventure in their lives, she buys the salvage company for which Nate worked, installing Nate as the owner, and plans to revive her old exploration show. Years later, Nate and Elena have become successful salvagers and archaeologists. After their teenage daughter Cassie (Kaitlyn Dever) discovers relics from their adventures, Nate decides to tell her their story.

Development 

Developer Naughty Dog split into two teams in 2009, to develop Uncharted 3: Drake's Deception and The Last of Us concurrently; the former team, led by creative director Amy Hennig and game director Justin Richmond, began preliminary work on Uncharted 4: A Thief's End after the release of Uncharted 3 in November 2011. Hennig and Richmond led development for several years, until their departure from the company in March 2014. Shortly after, Neil Druckmann and Bruce Straley were working on the game as creative director and game director, respectively; Druckmann and Straley had previously led the development of The Last of Us. Initial reports claimed that Hennig was "forced out" of Naughty Dog by Druckmann and Straley, though co-presidents Evan Wells and Christophe Balestra later denied this. After taking over development, Druckmann and Straley scrapped about "eight months of [Hennig's] story". They became committed to making Uncharted 4 the final game in the series, as there was "nowhere else" to take the characters. They faced great difficulty after Hennig's departure, due to the more limited development time and significant story changes.

An extended crunch schedule of 12-hour and up working days toward the end of development of Uncharted 4 caused significant attrition at Naughty Dog, according to a report by Kotakus Jason Schreier. 14 out of 20 non-lead designers credited in Uncharted 4 left the company after the game was released, the departure of 70% of the team. Straley was quoted as saying that he "would never want to do Uncharted 4 again... Because now we've lived through that". Straley also left the company shortly after release, following a sabbatical. Schreier suggested that development of Naughty Dog's next project, The Last of Us Part II (2020), was adversely affected and slowed due to the enormous turnover of employees, with few veterans left on the team.

Narrative and art design 
The game was written with a dialogue designer, in which several lines are inputted depending on the player's activity. The game's production process began with a story outline, describing the major events and beats, before becoming a process where writers and game designers collaborate, regularly rewriting scenes to fit the gameplay sequences. The ability to participate in optional conversations with non-player characters in The Last of Us was used in Uncharted 4 for players who wish to engage with the story. The game also features several dialogue trees, first used by Naughty Dog in The Last of Us: Left Behind (2014), to position players in the same mindset as Nathan.

Druckmann co-wrote the story alongside Josh Scherr; Druckmann considered Scherr the "funny one", allowing him to write the humor of Uncharted 4 due to Druckmann's self-professed inability to write jokes. He appreciated the collaboration of writing on Uncharted 4, having written The Last of Us almost entirely independently. Tom Bissell and Ryan M. James also provided additional writing on the game, particularly contributing to companion, enemy, and multiplayer dialogue; Bissell and James also performed the game's historical research. The writers challenged themselves to "tell a meaningful human story with complex relationships ... in this more lighthearted drama". The narrative pacing of the game was seen as a benchmark for several of its environments and gameplay beats. Despite adding some freedom and player decisions, the writers ultimately wanted to tell a specific story and explore specific emotional moments. The narrative explores the idea that "every treasure has a cost" and the extent to which one would go to save their loved ones. The game also explores the theme of family, both by surrogate and blood.

Uncharted 4 follows the search for the treasure of Captain Henry Avery and Thomas Tew. The outcome of Avery and Tew was included as a message that greed and obsession "will ultimately destroy you". The team constructed the game's ending early in development. They felt that the game's subtitle — A Thief's End – applied to several characters in the game, including Rafe Adler, and the pirate captains. The addition of the epilogue was to ensure the game ended definitively, instead of players questioning the events that followed. Straley explained that "there was something in the resolution that felt satisfying ... That felt right for the franchise as well".

When redesigning Nathan Drake for Uncharted 4, the team attempted a look akin to an adventurer, seeking inspiration from fictional characters such as Indiana Jones. In regards to Nathan's equipment, including his holster and pouch, the team aimed for subtlety, ensuring that they do not "steal the scene". Throughout development, Straley regularly worked with the designers to create the architecture of the environments, and the concept art department for the coloring and shapes of the game world. Several downbeats in the story are contrasted by bright colors; Straley wanted players to feel the juxtaposition. User interface designer Alexandria Neonakis was tasked with designing both Nathan's orphanage and Cassie's bedroom in Uncharted 4, placed at the beginning and end of the game, respectively. She worked with Druckmann to establish the lighting and dressing of the rooms. They were designed to contrast each other, to represent their different upbringings; while Nathan's room was designed to be stark and empty, Cassie's room has soft lighting and is full of posters and childhood items.

Character development 

Nolan North and Emily Rose portrayed Nathan Drake and Elena Fisher, respectively, in Uncharted 4, reprising their roles from previous entries in the series. Richard McGonagle reprised his role as Victor "Sully" Sullivan. Their performances were mostly recorded using motion capture technology, with remaining audio elements recorded later in a studio. The relationship between Nathan and Elena was a central focus of development, as the team attempted to humanize Nathan more than previous games. When Elena accompanies Nathan later in the game, the team found it necessary to "create a closer bond" between the two characters by removing the use of the vehicle, forcing players to traverse on foot alongside Elena. In developing the character of Nathan, the team wanted players to become conflicted between his relationship with Elena and the hunt for pirate treasure. The team considered Nathan a reflection of their own mentalities; as they have grown older and matured, Nathan has also matured in age and wisdom. North found that the aging of Nathan due to the advancement of technology humanizes him. McGonagle compared Nathan in Uncharted 4 to Sully in previous games; both consider themselves too old for treasure hunting.

Druckmann described Elena as "a very strong person who loves [Nathan] very much", ultimately encouraging her decision to return to him. When Elena witnesses Nathan's excitement regarding his discovery of the pirate captains, she realizes it is "what was missing" for them as a couple, and she "gets to see [him] as the adventurer she loves". The scene in which Nathan and Elena become trapped in a net was seen as a metaphor in which the two are drawn closer together, cooperating to escape before reconciling over a humorous situation. Straley found that Uncharted 4 allowed Nathan to discover his motivation, and to become vulnerable and trust another person in his life; events in his early life led him to develop a sarcastic attitude as a defense mechanism, which begins to diminish after receiving Elena's love and trust. Druckmann felt that the story questioned the possibility to "balance passion versus settling down", referencing the effects of crunch on the developers' lives.

The game's actors regularly contributed to the development of the characters; Druckmann found that the actors were more familiar with the character motivations, and took their advice while writing. Throughout the series, North tried to portray Nathan as a regular guy, as opposed to an "action star". In Uncharted 4, he found that the older ages of the characters allowed players to identify with them more closely, recognizing their struggles and establishing a connection with their own. The team wanted to place characters in uncomfortable situations, wherein the pressure of conflict propels them to discover new things. The team also found that the assistance given by non-player character allies during combat assisted in the story and character development. Straley wanted to explore character relationships deeper than previous Uncharted games, taking inspiration from the story of The Last of Us.

Troy Baker was chosen to portray Samuel "Sam" Drake, Nathan's brother who was presumed deceased. When cast in the role, Baker met with Druckmann and Scherr to discuss portraying Sam, who is older than Nathan, despite Baker being younger than North. Baker ultimately compared the relationship to his own friendship with actor Travis Willingham; despite Willingham's younger age, his life experiences have led Baker to look up to him, which he felt echoed sentiments of Nathan's relationship with Sam. Baker's pre-existing playful relationship with North eased his portrayal of the character, as he felt as though he was portraying himself. He and North also found that there was a sibling rivalry between the brothers, as they attempted to outsmart each other. North recalled difficulty in portraying the frequent animosity between Nathan and Sam, due to his close relationship with Baker, though found the "brotherly love" easy to play. Sam was developed to expose the feeling of "worthiness" in Nathan, encouraging him to adventure. The team added the flashback sequences of the brothers to demonstrate Nathan's intrigue for adventure, as well as Sam's care for Nathan. Since the development of Uncharted: Drake's Fortune (2007), the team regularly considered exploring Nathan's family history; while several additional characters were considered, including Nathan's father, the team did not properly explore Nathan's history until Uncharted 4, with the creation of Sam. Druckmann viewed Sam as a past version of Nathan, before the latter married Elena and quit treasure hunting. Druckmann said that "it's a way for [Nathan] to reflect and see what he was and why it's so important to mature and change". He also felt that it allowed the exploration of the question "Who is Nathan Drake?", and a deeper exploration of his evolution throughout the series.

The announcement of Laura Bailey, a white actress, portraying the character of Nadine Ross, who is of Black South African descent, led to some backlash. Druckmann explained that when the character was conceived, her ethnicity was not yet determined; Bailey was chosen from the audition of casting calls from actors of several heritages. Druckmann also noted that a Caucasian character in the game is voiced by a black voice actor. Concept artist Ashley Swidowski created the look of Nadine; Druckmann's curly hair was used as reference for Nadine's. Straley found that the inclusion of Nadine allowed the team to "pull out different dimensions" of antagonist Rafe Alder, due to her differing viewpoint on the treasure; while Nadine is interested in the monetary value of the treasure, Rafe has a more personal attachment to the discovery, eventually leading him to lash out against Nadine and Nathan. Druckmann also considered Rafe to be a reflection of Nathan, representing his ego. When writing scenes featuring Nadine or Rafe, Druckmann felt that they "don't see themselves as antagonist", stating that he "[wrote] with a clear motivation and clear objectives ... don't write them as clichés".

The character of Evelyn, portrayed by Merle Dandridge, became obsessed with traveling and hunting treasure, resulting in her family life diminishing; this was developed to parallel Nathan and Sam, and the outcome of pursuing treasure throughout their lives. Evelyn's character was originally an old English man. Throughout development, Druckmann was influenced by Swidowski to include more female characters in the game. He said that "she is constantly challenging me and pushing for diversity in our cast". Druckmann admitted that his development of the game's story was influenced by Anita Sarkeesian, a prominent feminist critic of gaming. Among the influences of Sarkeesian were switching the gender of Drake's child (originally a son) to be female and changing the outcome of conflicts so women would win more frequently to be seen as powerful and independent. Upon a focus tester's criticism regarding these changes, Druckmann instructed him to leave, responding "Wow, why does that matter?"

Technical and gameplay development 

Uncharted 4: A Thief's End was Naughty Dog's first game developed for the PlayStation 4, having re-released The Last of Us for the console as The Last of Us Remastered in July 2014. Remastered allowed the team to become accustomed to the architecture, having previously suffered great difficulties switching from PlayStation 2 hardware to PlayStation 3 during development of Drake's Fortune. Arne Meyer explained that "there's a lot of things we learned about our engine capabilities and our tools pipeline throughout development". The advanced hardware allowed the team to include more in each level, and create a more dynamic environment. Druckmann said that "they were at a point where technology isn't driving their decisions, but their creativity". While the team initially aimed for the entire game to run at 60 frames-per-second, restrictions in the environment limited the single-player mode to 30 frames-per-second; the multiplayer mode runs at 60 frames per second. The game's texture resolution is at least four times larger than Uncharted 3s, while a physically-based shader was developed to create more lifelike materials. In previous games, Nathan Drake's body skeleton consisted of 250 bones; in Uncharted 4, his face alone consists of 800 bones. The team found that the fidelity of the technology allowed close-up shots of the characters' faces to show emotion during cutscenes, demonstrating subtleties such as wrinkles and skin pores.

The team tried to "add dimension and complexity" to the climbing and traversal systems by including more problem-solving elements which did not interrupt the pacing of the narrative. The game world was also significantly increased from earlier entries in the series; technical art director Teagan Morrison estimated that the game features "maybe ten times the size ... of explorable space". A larger area allowed the team to create several paths for players to follow in order to complete objectives, though they faced difficulty in ensuring players remained focused on the overall goal of the area. Druckmann describes the game as "wide-linear", noting that "it's not open-world, because we wanted to tell a very specific story, with very specific tension". He feels that open world games often lack tension because players possess the freedom to lose focus on the main objective; Druckmann prefers to "control the pacing". The team's interest in featuring Crash Bandicoot (1996) in the game was initially met with legal disapproval; the team began working on a "different old-school game" in its place, until negotiations were made to include Crash Bandicoot.

Music and sound production 
The game's original score was written by Henry Jackman, with additional music by Alex Belcher, replacing former series composer Greg Edmonson. The score was co-produced by Jackman and Sony's senior music manager Jonathan Mayer, and was recorded with an orchestra at AIR Studios in London. The official soundtrack was released digitally on iTunes, Amazon Music, and Google Play Music alongside the game's launch on May 10, 2016, physically on vinyl by iam8bit on May 12, and on CD by La-La Land Records on May 17.

The game features about 55,000 lines of recorded dialogue, and its cinematics run for approximately 165 minutes in length. For the game's environment sounds, the team performed outdoor recording; they ensured the environments "felt alive but not overbuilt" by introducing several ambient changes as players progress through the locations. Audio lead Phillip Kovats said that "it's not a very static world at all ... the emotion is built up within the ambience". The sound also changes in respect to the background foliage; for example, when players walk through a bush, the sound may vary depending on the players's speed and the type of bush. The variation of in-game locations introduced several challenges for the team, as they attempted to make each location very different for players to feel as if "they were being propelled to different locations across the world". The game also uses quadraphonic sound, which senior sound designer Jeremy Rogers described as more "intricate" than previous games, due to availability of memory while developing Uncharted 4.

The team found the sound design of the in-game Jeep challenging. They traveled to California and Nevada, where they recorded sounds of a Jeep traversing through terrain. They also recorded the sound of tires on several surfaces at a foley recording stage. Each tire of the Jeep interacts separately with a surface, dependent on elements such as the type of surface and pressure of the tire, thereby allowing several simultaneous sounds during gameplay. Each sound effect in the game has metadata instructing the engine to play the sound in a specific manner. When designing the sounds of the grappling hook, Rogers recorded the sounds of a bullwhip crafted by David Morgan, responsible for the bullwhips used in the Indiana Jones franchise; he considered the sounds to be an homage to the franchise.

Release 

Several journalists speculated the development of Uncharted 4 before its announcement, citing job listings at Naughty Dog and apparent leaks from retailers. The existence of a new entry in the Uncharted series was officially acknowledged by Sony on November 14, 2013, with the release of an official trailer. The game's full title was unveiled on June 9 at Sony's E3 2014 press conference. Later in September 2015, Naughty Dog announced that Uncharted 4 would miss its intended release date of late 2015, delaying it until March 18, 2016 to allow further polishing for the game's ending. The game was delayed twice more for further polishing: first until April, and finally to May 10. Amazon began prematurely shipping copies of the game on April 26, 2016. The following day, Shuhei Yoshida, President of Sony's Worldwide Studios for Sony Computer Entertainment, stated that copies of the game were stolen while in transit to retail in the United Kingdom. Naughty Dog employees expressed disappointment in those sharing spoilers online. Naughty Dog announced single-player downloadable content, due to the success of The Last of Us: Left Behind. Uncharted: The Lost Legacy, a stand-alone expansion, was released in August 2017 for PlayStation 4, featuring Chloe Frazer and Nadine Ross.

In May 2021, it was reported that the game would be released for Windows, according to an investor presentation by Sony. In September, a remastered version of the game for PlayStation 5 and Windows was announced as part of the Uncharted: Legacy of Thieves Collection, with The Lost Legacy. It was released for PlayStation 5 on January 28, 2022; the Windows version, developed in collaboration with Iron Galaxy, was released on October 19, 2022. Purchasing or upgrading the game in some regions through the PlayStation Store granted a voucher code for a ticket to the film Uncharted (2022). A launch trailer for Legacy of Thieves Collection was released on January 21, 2022.

Promotion 
A Sony marketing manager said that Uncharted 4 was "PlayStation's largest ever software investment". The debut trailer was released along with the game announcement, on November 14, 2013, featuring the voice of Todd Stashwick. The trailer shows an ancient map of the African continent, stopping at Madagascar, where Île Sainte-Marie is marked. A trailer was unveiled at E3 2014 on June 10, showcasing the game's concept, returning characters, and setting. The first game cinematic was showcased at E3 2015 on June 16, depicting a scene in which Nathan and Sully are ambushed by enemies, before making chase to reach Sam. An extended trailer was showcased in private, depicting Nathan reaching Sam, and the two killing and outrunning the enemies on a motorcycle before meeting Sully and Elena; the extended trailer was released on July 1, 2016.

A trailer for the game's online multiplayer mode was released on October 27, 2015, as part of Paris Games Week, depicting its various game modes and features; the multiplayer was playable at the PlayStation Experience in December. Two further multiplayer trailers were also released for the PlayStation Experience on December 3. A game cinematic, introducing Nadine Ross, was shown at The Game Awards on December 4, followed by an additional clip of Nadine and Sully at the PlayStation Experience on December 5. A cinematic depicting Nathan and Sam's reunion was also showcased at the PlayStation Experience, introducing the game's branching dialogue options. A trailer titled "Man Behind the Treasure" was shown before select screenings of Star Wars: The Force Awakens (2015), and published online on December 21; it features a piano version of the Pixies song "Where Is My Mind?". A behind-the-scenes video of the game, which also played before screenings of Star Wars, was also published.

The game's story trailer, which Druckmann considers "the best trailer in Naughty Dog's history", was released on February 24, 2016. Upon its release, Ubisoft's Aymar Azaïzia noticed the use of a piece of art from Assassin's Creed IV: Black Flag (2013); Naughty Dog replaced the art in a new version of the trailer, and released a statement apologizing to Ubisoft. A trailer titled "Heads or Tails", depicting Nathan contemplating his choices, was released on March 25; it was shown before select screenings of Batman v Superman: Dawn of Justice and 10 Cloverfield Lane (both 2016). A trailer for the multiplayer mode Plunder was released on April 22; it was playable at PAX East on April 22–24. The final pre-launch trailer was released on April 25, 2016.

A beta for Uncharted 4s multiplayer mode was included with all copies of Uncharted: The Nathan Drake Collection, and was available from December 4–13, 2015. An open beta was later available from March 4–7, 2016, to all users. To encourage pre-order sales, Naughty Dog collaborated with several outlets to provide special edition versions of the game. The "Special Edition" includes a Steelbook case, a hardcover art book, and unlock codes for additional content in the multiplayer mode. The "Libertalia Collector's Edition" contained the same content, in addition to a statue of Nathan Drake. The game's cover art was unveiled on June 3, 2015, featuring Nathan Drake. Sony released a 500 GB PlayStation 4 console, which includes a copy of the game and a set of Uncharted 4-branded DualShock 4 controllers. A pair of Uncharted 4-themed PlayStation headphones was also released.

Reception

Critical response 

Uncharted 4: A Thief's End received "universal acclaim" according to review aggregator Metacritic. It is the joint sixth-highest rated PlayStation 4 game on Metacritic. Reviewers praised the gameplay mechanics, narrative, emotional depth, visual design, and the multiplayer mode. IGNs Lucy O'Brien wrote that the game is "a remarkable achievement in blockbuster storytelling and graphical beauty"; GameSpots Mike Mahardy similarly named it a "breathtaking marvel of a game". GamesTM considered it "a masterful piece of storytelling", and Electronic Gaming Monthlys Nick Plessas declared it "a true work of art".

Giant Bombs Dan Ryckert considered the game's graphics to be the best on any console, particularly praising the character details and open environments. Steven Hansen of Destructoid described the art direction as "stunning", while Andrew Reiner of Game Informer described the game as "a work of art". GamesRadar'''s Leon Hurley praised the minute graphical details that made the game's characters feel more alive. GameSpots Mahardy noted that the game's cinematography, both in gameplay and during cutscenes, "amplifies the wonder of this gorgeous world". The Escapists Liz Finnegan described the game as "painfully beautiful", and Sam Loveridge of Digital Spy lauded Naughty Dog's ability to create "cleverly crafted stunning vistas".

Griffin McElroy of Polygon felt that the game's narrative was nuanced in contrast to its predecessors. Destructoid Hansen praised the game's writers for bringing the narrative to a cohesive conclusion. Game Informers Reiner particularly appreciated the writing for Henry Avery, lauding the writers for turning his secrets into "tantalizing story material"; conversely, Ars Technicas Kyle Orland found that the enthusiasm of the characters "fails to be infectious for the player". Mahardy of GameSpot wrote that the game's set pieces are the best in the series and among the best in video gaming. Finnegan of The Escapist felt that the "action never feels unnaturally halted in order to relay relevant pieces of the story". Plessas of Electronic Gaming Monthly found enjoyment in the game's subtler interactions more than the overall narrative. Zack Handlen of The A.V. Club lauded the game's dramatic moments. Steven Burns of VideoGamer.com felt that, while the game's story was better than its predecessors, it had too much padding that slowed it down.

The game's characters and relationships received particular praise. Hansen of Destructoid felt that the character relationships were not overshadowed by the game's action, particularly praising the performance of Emily Rose as Elena for "perfectly and subtly conveying the intricacies of her relationship". Polygons McElroy felt that the chemistry between the two characters was at its best in Uncharted 4. Giant Bombs Ryckert echoed this sentiment, adding that the conversations between Nathan and Sam Drake felt "more natural than hammy". GameSpots Mahardy wrote that the additional details revealed about Nathan are "painfully human", helping to bring the characters to life. Hurley of GamesRadar felt that the addition of Sam and his backstory crowded the narrative and that removing the character would have improved the game. Stephen Totilo of Kotaku considered Sam to be "more of a plot device for others to react to than a compelling character on his own".

Mahardy of GameSpot wrote that the game's action "flows seamlessly alongside its narrative", praising the addition of stealth combat and its similarity to The Last of Us. Giant Bombs Ryckert felt that the player's companions were more fleshed-out than in previous entries. Tom Hoggins of The Telegraph described the game's firearm gameplay as "punchy and pleasing", appreciating the fast pace of combat scenarios. Destructoids Hansen described the game's puzzles as "fluid and dynamic", particularly lauding the addition of the grappling hook. Game Informers Reiner echoed the latter sentiment, noting that the grappling hook enhances exploration and combat, but felt that the game's set pieces delivered less exciting moments than in previous games.Game Informers Reiner wrote that the game's "environments are so vast that they take on the illusion of open worlds". IGNs O'Brien found the addition of choices in the game refreshing. Hoggins of The Telegraph felt that the game's open environments make the player feel like "more of an adventurer". Loveridge of Digital Spy appreciated the additional freedom granted by the new combat options, allowing the player to map their tactics in advance. Hurley of GamesRadar praised the improved gameplay, but felt that some nonlinear moments such as optional interactions and dialogue were "a little overcooked" in comparison to previous entries. Keith Stuart of The Guardian found the game's linearity to be immersion-breaking, particularly criticizing the repetition in traversal. USgamer's Mike Williams felt that the open driving level "robs the game of its pacing" despite granting the feeling of a larger scale.

Critics shared generally positive reviews for Uncharted 4s multiplayer component but felt that the single-player mode took precedence. O'Brien of IGN wrote that the multiplayer game types "embody the series' most enjoyable qualities", while Hurley of GamesRadar felt that it benefited from the new mechanics introduced in the single-player story. Polygons McElroy considered the multiplayer mode "extremely easy to pick up on", and Loveridge of Digital Spy found the multiplayer approachable and enjoyable. Game Informers Reiner described the multiplayer combat as "fevered" and exciting, but encountered issues with loading matches. Giant Bombs Ryckert considered the multiplayer "basic", noting that players are unlikely to return for long.

 Sales 
Within seven days of its release, Uncharted 4 sold over 2.7million units, making it the fastest-selling first-party PlayStation 4 game. By December 2016, the game had sold 8.7million copies, making it one of the best-selling PlayStation 4 games. By May 2019, the game had sold over 15million copies. In the United States, it was the best-selling retail game in May 2016. In the United Kingdom, the game topped the charts, achieving the strongest debut of the series with a 66% increase in first-week sales over Uncharted 3. In Japan, the game topped the charts in its first week, with over 128,000 units sold; it remained atop the charts the following week, with an additional 21,000 units sold.

 Accolades 
Following its previews at E3, Uncharted 4 was nominated for numerous awards, including Best PlayStation Game from several gaming publications. After its release, the game garnered awards and nominations in a variety of categories with particular praise for its gameplay mechanics, narrative, emotional depth, visual design, and multiplayer. At The Game Awards 2016, Uncharted 4 was nominated for eight awards, winning two: Best Narrative and Best Performance for North. The game received ten nominations at the 20th Annual D.I.C.E. Awards and four awards, including Adventure Game of the Year and Outstanding Achievement in Story. It was nominated for four awards at the 6th Annual New York Video Game Awards and seven at the 17th Annual Game Developers Choice Awards. The game won Outstanding Character Animation in a Video Game at the 44th Annie Awards, Outstanding Visual Effects in a Real-Time Project at the 15th Visual Effects Society Awards, and Outstanding Achievement in Videogame Writing at the 67th Writers Guild of America Awards. At the 2017 SXSW Gaming Awards, the game won five awards out of eight nominations, including Video Game of the Year, Excellence in Narrative, and Most Memorable Character. The game received eight nominations at the 13th British Academy Games Awards, ultimately winning Best Game.

 In other media 
The 2022 Uncharted film takes inspiration from A Thief's End''.

Notes

References

External links

 
 

2016 video games
Action-adventure games
Annie Award winners
British Academy Games Award for Best Game winners
D.I.C.E. Award for Adventure Game of the Year winners
Multiplayer and single-player video games
Naughty Dog games
Platform games
PlayStation 4 games
PlayStation 4 Pro enhanced games
PlayStation 5 games
Sony Interactive Entertainment games
Stealth video games
Third-person shooters
Uncharted
Video game sequels
Video games developed in the United States
Video games scored by Henry Jackman
Video games set in Italy
Video games set in Madagascar
Video games set in New Orleans
Video games set in Panama
Video games set in prison
Video games set in Scotland
Video games set in the United States
Video games set on islands
Video games using Havok
Video games with expansion packs
Video games written by Neil Druckmann
Windows games
Iron Galaxy games